The Mangahao River is located in the North Island of New Zealand. The headwaters are in the Tararua Ranges. The river flows northeast feeds into the Manawatu River south of Woodville.

There are two dams on the river which tunnel water, via a third reservoir on the Tokomaru River, to the Mangahao Power Station located on the Mangaore Stream near Shannon.

Geology 
Within the last 10,000 years the upper  of the river has been captured at Kakariki from the Hukanui Stream, which feeds the Mangatainoka River. The crush zone of the Wellington Fault probably assisted the capture.

References

 
Rivers of Manawatū-Whanganui
Rivers of New Zealand